Black Mountain National Park may refer to:

 Kalkajaka National Park (formerly Black Mountain (Kalkajaka) National Park), protected area in the State of Queensland, Australia, 25 km south west of Cooktown
 Jigme Singye Wangchuck National Park (formerly Black Mountains National Park), protected area in central Bhutan